Rehnuma Dilruba Chitra is a Bangladeshi model and beauty pageant titleholder who was crowned Miss Bangladesh 1996 and represented Bangladesh at Miss World 1996.

References

Bangladeshi beauty pageant winners
Bangladeshi female models
Living people
Miss World 1996 delegates
Year of birth missing (living people)